Malcolm Burr (6 July 1878 - 13 July 1954) was an English author, translator, entomologist, and geologist. He taught English at the School of Economics in Istanbul, and spent most of his life in Turkey.

Life 
Burr was a noted specialist of earwigs (Dermaptera) and crickets and grasshoppers (Orthoptera). He was the first to classify earwigs on the basis of copulatory organs, and the diversity and biology of the earwigs of Sri Lanka is well studied due to major contributions by Burr in 1901.

He also met and befriended the White émigré Paul Nazaroff, whose works he translated from Russian into English (including Hunted through Central Asia).

Private life
He married Clara Millicent Goode in 1903 and they had four daughters, Gabrille Ruth Millicent, Rowena Frances, Yolanda Elizabeth and another.

Bibliography  
 
 
 
 
 Dersu the Trapper (translated by Malcolm Burr), published by Secker & Warburg, London 1939 (First English edition)

See also 
 Epilandex burri, a species of earwig named after Burr
 List of Vanity Fair (British magazine) caricatures (1910–14)

References

External links 
 Malcolm Burr at the National Portrait Gallery, London

1878 births
1954 deaths
English translators
English geologists
English writers
Entomologists from London
People from Blackheath, London
British expatriates in Turkey